CARMIL1 is a protein that in humans is encoded by the CARMIL1 gene. The gene is also known as LRRC16, LRRC16A, CARMIL, or CARMIL1a.

Model organisms

Model organisms have been used in the study of CARMIL1 function. A conditional knockout mouse line, called Lrrc16atm1a(KOMP)Wtsi was generated as part of the International Knockout Mouse Consortium program — a high-throughput mutagenesis project to generate and distribute animal models of disease to interested scientists — at the Wellcome Trust Sanger Institute.

Male and female animals underwent a standardized phenotypic screen to determine the effects of deletion. Twenty two tests were carried out on mutant mice but no significant abnormalities were observed.

References

Further reading 
 

Human proteins
Genes mutated in mice